Neuroethics is a triannual peer-reviewed academic journal covering the field of neuroethics and related issues in the sciences of the mind. In the opening editorial, founding editor-in-chief Neil Levy described the journal as focusing on both "ethical reflection on new technologies and techniques produced by neuroscience (and other sciences of the mind)" and "the ways in which the new knowledge emerging from the sciences of the mind illuminates traditional philosophical topics."

The journal is published by Springer Science+Business Media and is co-edited by Adrian Carter (Monash University) and Katrina Sifferd (Elmhurst University).

Abstracting and indexing 
The journal is abstracted and indexed in:

According to the Journal Citation Reports, the journal has a 2018 impact factor of 0.986.

References

External links

English-language journals
Ethics journals
Neurology journals
Publications established in 2008
Triannual journals
Springer Science+Business Media academic journals